Mine La Motte is an unincorporated community and census-designated place in Madison County, Missouri, United States. It is located approximately six miles north of Fredericktown. Europeans discovered lead here and had also hoped to find silver. The French Governor of Louisiana, Antoine de la Mothe Cadillac, failed to find silver, but succeeded in recruiting investors in The Company of the West, which was organized in 1717. Mine La Motte was eventually settled by about 200 French settlers along with their slaves from Santo Domingo, under the leadership of Philip François Renault, to develop mines in 1717, making it one of the oldest settlements west of the Mississippi River. The presence of lead, a critical ingredient for ammunition, attracted unusually early mining by French colonists in this otherwise remote interior region of the North American continent. That same lead, still used for ammunition at the time of the American Civil War, was also a factor in the Battle of Fredericktown in which forces aligned with the Confederate States of America fought for control of the lead smelters in nearby Fredericktown with the Unionist forces, aligned with the United States of America.

La Mothe named the mine after himself, and the town that grew up nearby was named after the mine. While dispatching workers and supervisors to the mines, La Mothe settled for a time in the Illinois Country east of the mid-Mississippi River, where the first French colonial villages were founded. In 1804 the village had a population of 150. These settlers were mostly French Canadians who developed agriculture. Due to the rich soils, they were quickly able to produce grain surpluses that were critical to the survival of the lower Louisiana colony.  The habitants shipped tons of grain to New Orleans and other points south on the Mississippi River. La Mothe later served as Governor-General of Louisiana.

Demographics

References

See also
 Southeast Missouri Lead District

Unincorporated communities in Madison County, Missouri
Lead mining
French colonial settlements of Upper Louisiana
Unincorporated communities in Missouri
Census-designated places in Missouri